Khishigbatyn Erdenet-Od (born 7 July 1975) is a retired Mongolian judoka.

Participating at the 2004 Olympic Games, she was stopped in the round of 16 by Kie Kusakabe of Japan.

She won a bronze medal at the 2005 World Judo Championships after a walk-over in the bronze medal match. This was Mongolia's first World Championships medal for women.

She finished fifth in the lightweight category (57 kg) at the 2006 Asian Games, having lost to Ok Song Hong of North Korea in the bronze medal match.
She currently resides in Ulan Bator.

References

External links
 
2006 Asian Games profile

1975 births
Living people
Mongolian female judoka
Judoka at the 1992 Summer Olympics
Judoka at the 2000 Summer Olympics
Judoka at the 2004 Summer Olympics
Judoka at the 2008 Summer Olympics
Olympic judoka of Mongolia
Sportspeople from Ulaanbaatar
Asian Games medalists in judo
Judoka at the 1998 Asian Games
Judoka at the 2002 Asian Games
Judoka at the 2006 Asian Games
Asian Games gold medalists for Mongolia
Asian Games bronze medalists for Mongolia
Medalists at the 1998 Asian Games
Medalists at the 2002 Asian Games
Universiade medalists in judo
Universiade bronze medalists for Mongolia
Medalists at the 1999 Summer Universiade
20th-century Mongolian women
21st-century Mongolian women